Leucopogon confertus, commonly known as Torrington beard-heath, is a species of flowering plant in the heath family Ericaceae and is endemic to a restricted part of New South Wales. It is a small shrub with erect, oblong or lance-shaped leaves, and white, tube-shaped flowers, the petals with shaggy hairs.

Description
Leucopogon confertus is a small shrub with softly-hairy branchlets. Both sides of the leaves are covered with bristly hairs.

Taxonomy
Leucopogon confertus was first formally described in 1868 by George Bentham in Flora Australiensis from specimens collected by Charles Stuart. The specific epithet (confertus) means "crowded".

Distribution and habitat
Torrington beard-heath is only known from the type collection and is thought to grow in open forest or woodland on rocky granite soil near Torrington on the Northern Tablelands of New South Wales.

Conservation status
Leucopogon confertus is listed as "endangered" under the Australian Government Environment Protection and Biodiversity Conservation Act 1999 and the New South Wales Government Biodiversity Conservation Act 2016. The likely threats to the species include roadworks, grazing by feral goats and pigs, but repeated searches for the plant have failed, and it may already be extinct.

References

confertus
Ericales of Australia
Flora of New South Wales
Plants described in 1868
Taxa named by George Bentham